An Evening of Yes Music and More was a worldwide concert tour by the rock band Yes Featuring Jon Anderson, Trevor Rabin, Rick Wakeman, formed by lead vocalist Jon Anderson, guitarist Trevor Rabin and keyboardist Rick Wakeman, all former members of the English rock band Yes. Launched ten months after the group officially announced their formation, the tour visited theatres, halls, and arenas across North America, Europe and Asia.

The name of the tour is a reference to An Evening of Yes Music Plus, a 1989-90 concert tour by ABWH, an older band which also consisted of former Yes members, and of which Anderson and Wakeman were members.

The tour is documented on a live album and DVD.

Overview
The tour began on 4 October 2016 under the name Anderson, Rabin and Wakeman and ran until the end of summer 2017. The band started using the new name of Yes Featuring Jon Anderson, Trevor Rabin and Rick Wakeman on the early 2017 tour leg, and then launched the new name in April to promote the North American summer tour.

Additional touring musicians were bassist Lee Pomeroy and drummer Lou Molino III. The tour marked the first time the three former Yes members performed together since Yes' Union Tour of 1991–1992. The tour saw two songs dropped from the set after only one show: "Leaves of Green" and "Starship Trooper". Other songs were steadily added to the set as Rabin's confidence in his voice improved; the song "Lift Me Up" was added for the second show on 7 October 2016, and a fan favourite, "Changes", was added to the show on 22 October 2016.

Personnel 

Yes featuring Jon Anderson, Trevor Rabin and Rick Wakeman
Jon Anderson – lead and backing vocals, acoustic rhythm guitar, Celtic harp, percussion
Trevor Rabin – lead guitars (acoustic and electric), timpani on "Awaken," backing and lead vocals
Rick Wakeman – keyboards, synthesisers

Additional musicians
Lee Pomeroy – bass, backing vocals (except Japan)
Lou Molino III – drums, percussion, backing vocals
Iain Hornal – bass, backing vocals (Japan only)

Special guests
Ryan Rabin - drums on "Owner of a Lonely Heart" (22 November 2016)

Setlists

Pre-tour speculation
In an interview with Rolling Stone magazine, Anderson stated that the band would perform classic Yes songs like "Awaken" and "And You and I" as well as some songs from Talk (1994), 90125 (1983) and Big Generator (1987). Anderson also hinted at the songs "Perpetual Change" and "Starship Trooper" to be played. He also assured that the setlist shouldn't fluctuate from night to night, stating: "It's like a movie to me, a play. Once you've got [the setlist] right, you stick to it since it'll only get better. If you start changing it you finish up a little bit confused."

In a separate interview with The Prog Report Rabin stated that "Shoot High, Aim Low" was due to be performed on the tour as well as "a lot from 90125".

Setlists
Setlist 1 (4 October 2016 – 22 July 2017)
The currently known setlist (all songs are by Yes unless otherwise noted):

Intro: Classical arrangement of the "Perpetual Change" theme
"Cinema"
"Perpetual Change"
"Hold On"
"I've Seen All Good People"
Drum solo / "Lift Me Up"(added on 7 October 2016; not played on 27 November 2016 due to Rabin being too unwell to sing.)
"And You and I"
"Rhythm of Love"
"Heart of the Sunrise"(originally played between "The Meeting" and "Awaken"; moved to this position from 22 October 2016 onwards)
"Changes"(added on 22 October 2016; not played on 27 November 2016 due to Rabin being too unwell to sing.)
"Long Distance Runaround"
"The Fish (Schindleria Praematurus)" (tribute to Chris Squire)(From 30 November 2016 this was extended to include excerpts from "On the Silent Wings of Freedom" and "The Revealing Science of God".)
"The Meeting" (ABWH song) (Dropped from 27 November 2016 – 25 March 2017.)
"Awaken"(originally played before "Long Distance Runaround"; moved to this position from 7 October 2016 onwards.)
"Make It Easy" / "Owner of a Lonely Heart"

Encore:
"Roundabout"(originally played after "The Fish"; moved to this position from 7 October 2016 onwards, replacing "Starship Trooper" as the encore.)

 Other songs
 "Leaves of Green" (excerpt from "The Ancient") (originally played after "Rhythm of Love")(only played at the first show on 4 October 2016 i.e. dropped from 7 October 2016 onwards)
 "Starship Trooper" (originally played as the unique encore)(only played at the first show on 4 October 2016 i.e. dropped from 7 October 2016 onwards)
 "Hatikvah"(National anthem of Israel. Performed by Rabin on guitar on 7 March 2017. Played between "Heart of the Sunrise" and "Changes")

Setlist 2 (26 August 2017 onwards)
On 26 August 2017 the band changed their set list. The new set list was as follows:

 "Cinema"
 "Perpetual Change"
 "Hold On"
 "South Side of the Sky"
 "Lift Me Up" (Until 9 September 2017)
 "And You and I"
 "Changes" (From 9 September 2017 onwards)
 "Rhythm of Love"
 "I am Waiting"
 "Heart of the Sunrise"
 "Awaken"
 "Make It Easy" / "Owner of a Lonely Heart"

Encore:

 "Roundabout"

Tour dates
On 5 October 2016, the band announced, via their official Facebook page, that the original shows scheduled for 6 October and 12 October were to be cancelled. The show on 6 October at the Seminole Hard Rock Hotel & Casino was cancelled due to a hurricane warning and has been rescheduled for the same venue on 12 October. The original 12 October show at the Heinz Hall in Pittsburg has been cancelled due to an orchestra strike in the city and has been rescheduled for 30 October 2016 at the Byham Theatre. On 12 October 2016, ARW announced a second London show.

On 19 October 2016 Wakeman announced, via his personal blog, that an Israel show has been booked for 7 March 2017 and Japan dates for April 2017 before returning to North America in the summer of 2017.

References

External links 
 Official website at yesfeaturingarw.com
 Official Facebook page at Facebook.com/YESfeaturingARW
 Official Twitter account at Twitter.com/YESfeaturingARW

2016 concert tours
2017 concert tours
Yes (band) concert tours